The Formula may refer to:
 The Formula (1980 film), a mystery film
 The Formula (2002 film), a fan film
 "The Formula" (song), a 1989 single by The D.O.C. from the album No One Can Do It Better
 The Formula (album), a 2008 collaborative album by Buckshot and 9th Wonder
 La Formula (album) (English: The Formula), a 2012 album by La Formula